Notiophilus novemstriatus is a species of ground beetle in the family Carabidae. It is found in North America, occurring throughout the eastern U.S. states and as far west as Arizona. Approximately 4.5mm long, it is a brassy black color, with a wide head and large eyes.

References

Further reading

 

Nebriinae
Articles created by Qbugbot
Beetles described in 1847